"Loving You" is a song written by Jerry Leiber and Mike Stoller and performed by Elvis Presley featuring The Jordanaires. It reached No. 15 on the U.S. country chart, #20 on the U.S. pop chart, and #24 on the UK Singles Chart in 1957.  It was featured on his 1957 album Loving You.  It was featured in Presley's 1957 movie Loving You.

The single's A-side, "(Let Me Be Your) Teddy Bear" reached No. 1 on the U.S. pop, country, and R&B charts and #3 on the UK Singles Chart in 1957.

Other versions
Duane Eddy released a version of the song on his 1958 album Have 'Twangy' Guitar Will Travel.
Chubby Checker and Dee Dee Sharp released a version of the song on their 1962 album Down to Earth.
The Righteous Brothers released a version of the song on their 1965 album Back to Back.
Billy Fury released a version of the song as a single in 1967, but it did not chart.
Françoise Hardy released a version of the song as the B-side to her 1968 single "Will You Love Me Tomorrow".
Nat Stuckey released a version of the song as a single in 1968, but it did not chart.
Anita Harris released a version of the song as a single in 1969, but it did not chart.
The Dave Clark Five released a version of the song as a single as part of a medley in 1971, but it did not chart.
Donna Fargo featuring The Jordanaires released a version of the song on her 1977 album Shame on Me.
Paul McCartney released a version of the song on his 1992 album What a Mean Fiddler.
The Platters released a version of the song on their 1998 album Selection of the Platters.

References

1957 songs
1957 singles
1967 singles
1968 singles
1969 singles
1971 singles
Songs written by Jerry Leiber and Mike Stoller
Elvis Presley songs
Duane Eddy songs
Chubby Checker songs
Dee Dee Sharp songs
The Righteous Brothers songs
Billy Fury songs
Françoise Hardy songs
Nat Stuckey songs
The Dave Clark Five songs
Donna Fargo songs
Paul McCartney songs
The Platters songs
RCA Records singles
RCA Victor singles
CBS Records singles